The Bakulahi Bridge in Katra Gulab Singh, also known as Bakulahi Pull or Bakulahi Pull Chungi, is a bridge, built across the Katra Gulab Singh that connects the two district, Pratapgarh to Allahabad of Indian state Uttar Pradesh. This bridge was built in 1989.

Gallery

References

Truss bridges
Bridges in Uttar Pradesh
Buildings and structures in Pratapgarh district, Uttar Pradesh
Transport in Pratapgarh, Uttar Pradesh
Transport in Allahabad district